A pollinator is an animal that moves pollen from the male anther of a flower to the female stigma of a flower. This helps to bring about fertilization of the ovules in the flower by the male gametes from the pollen grains.

Insects are the major pollinators of most plants, and insect pollinators include all families of bees and most families of aculeate wasps; ants; many families of flies; many lepidopterans (both butterflies and moths); and many families of beetles. Vertebrates, mainly bats and birds, but also some non-bat mammals (monkeys, lemurs, possums, rodents) and some lizards pollinate certain plants. Among the pollinating birds are hummingbirds, honeyeaters and sunbirds with long beaks; they pollinate a number of deep-throated flowers. Humans may also carry out artificial pollination.

A pollinator is different from a pollenizer, a plant that is a source of pollen for the pollination process.

Background
Plants fall into pollination syndromes that reflect the type of pollinator being attracted. These are characteristics such as: overall flower size, the depth and width of the corolla, the color (including patterns called nectar guides that are visible only in ultraviolet light), the scent, amount of nectar, composition of nectar, etc. For example, birds visit red flowers with long, narrow tubes and much nectar, but are not as strongly attracted to wide flowers with little nectar and copious pollen, which are more attractive to beetles. When these characteristics are experimentally modified (altering colour, size, orientation), pollinator visitation may decline.

It has recently been discovered that cycads, which are not flowering plants, are also pollinated by insects. In 2016, researchers showed evidence of pollination occurring underwater, which was previously thought not to happen.

Types of pollinators

Bees

The most recognized pollinators are the various species of bees, which are plainly adapted to pollination. Bees typically are fuzzy and carry an electrostatic charge. Both features help pollen grains adhere to their bodies, but they also have specialized pollen-carrying structures; in most bees, this takes the form of a structure known as the scopa, which is on the hind legs of most bees, and/or the lower abdomen (e.g., of megachilid bees), made up of thick, plumose setae. Honey bees, bumblebees, and their relatives do not have a scopa, but the hind leg is modified into a structure called the corbicula (also known as the "pollen basket"). Most bees gather nectar, a concentrated energy source, and pollen, which is high protein food, to nurture their young, and transfer some among the flowers as they are working. Euglossine bees pollinate orchids, but these are male bees collecting floral scents rather than females gathering nectar or pollen. Female orchid bees act as pollinators, but of flowers other than orchids. Eusocial bees such as honey bees need an abundant and steady pollen source to multiply.

Honey bees

Honey bees travel from flower to flower, collecting nectar (later converted to honey), and pollen grains. The bee collects the pollen by rubbing against the anthers. The pollen collects on the hind legs, in a structure referred to as a "pollen basket". As the bee flies from flower to flower, some of the pollen grains are transferred onto the stigma of other flowers. Nectar provides the energy for bee nutrition; pollen provides the protein. When bees are rearing large quantities of brood (beekeepers say hives are "building"), bees deliberately gather pollen to meet the nutritional needs of the brood.

Good pollination management seeks to have bees in a "building" state during the bloom period of the crop, thus requiring them to gather pollen, and making them more efficient pollinators. Thus, the management techniques of a beekeeper providing pollination services are different from, and to some extent in tension with, those of a beekeeper who is trying to produce honey. Millions of hives of honey bees are contracted out as pollinators by beekeepers, and honey bees are by far the most important commercial pollinating agents, but many other kinds of pollinators, from blue bottle flies, to bumblebees, orchard mason bees, and leaf cutter bees are cultured and sold for managed pollination.

Other species of bees differ in various details of their behavior and pollen-gathering habits, and honey bees are not native to the Western Hemisphere; all pollination of native plants in the Americas and Australia historically has been performed by various native bees.

Other insects

Many insects other than bees accomplish pollination by visiting flowers for nectar or pollen, or commonly both. Many do so adventitiously, but the most important pollinators are specialists for at least parts of their life cycles for at least certain functions. 

Prominent among Hymenoptera other than bees are predatory aculeate wasps (especially Crabronidae, Sphecidae, Vespidae, and Pompilidae). The term "pollen wasps", in particular, is widely applied to the Masarinae, a subfamily of the Vespidae; they are remarkable among solitary wasps in that they specialise in gathering pollen for feeding their larvae, carried internally and regurgitated into a mud chamber prior to oviposition. Also, males of many species of bees and wasps, though they do not gather pollen, rely on flowers as sources of energy (in the form of nectar) and also as territories for meeting fertile females that visit the flowers. 

Many bee flies, and some Tabanidae and Nemestrinidae are particularly adapted to pollinating fynbos and Karoo plants with narrow, deep corolla tubes, such as Lapeirousia species. Part of the adaptation takes the form of remarkably long probosces. This also applies to empidine dance flies (Empidinae) that visit a wide range of flowering plants, some species of which can pollinate the woodland geranium (Geranium sylvaticum L.) as effectively as bees.

Carrion flies and flesh flies in families such as Calliphoridae and Sarcophagidae are important for some species of plants whose flowers exude a fetid odor. The plants' ecological strategy varies; several species of Stapelia, for example, attract carrion flies that futilely lay their eggs on the flower, where their larvae promptly starve for lack of carrion. Other species do decay rapidly after ripening, and offer the visiting insects large masses of food, as well as pollen and sometimes seed to carry off when they leave.

Hoverflies are important pollinators of flowering plants worldwide. Often hoverflies are considered to be the second most important pollinators after wild bees. Although hoverflies as a whole are generally considered to be nonselective pollinators,  some species have more specialized relationships. The orchid species Epipactis veratrifolia mimics alarm pheromones of aphids to attract hover flies for pollination. Another plant, the slipper orchid in southwest China, also achieves pollination by deceit by exploiting the innate yellow colour preference of syrphids.

Some male dacine fruit flies are exclusive pollinators of some wild Bulbophyllum orchids that lack nectar and have a specific chemical attractant and reward (methyl eugenol, raspberry ketone or zingerone) present in their floral fragrances.

Some adult mosquitoes, if they feed on nectar, may act as pollinators; Aedes communis, a species found in North America, is known to pollinate Platanthera obtusata, commonly referred as the blunt-leaved orchid.

Some Diptera (flies) may be the main pollinators at higher elevations of mountains, whereas bumblebee species are typically the only other pollinators in alpine regions at timberline and beyond.

Lepidoptera (butterflies and moths) may also pollinate to various degrees. They are not major pollinators of food crops, but various moths are important pollinators of other commercial crops such as tobacco. Pollination by certain moths may be important, however, or even crucial, for some wildflowers mutually adapted to specialist pollinators. Spectacular examples include orchids such as Angraecum sesquipedale, dependent on a particular hawk moth, Morgan's sphinx. Yucca species provide other examples, being fertilised in elaborate ecological interactions with particular species of yucca moths.

Beetles of species that specialise in eating pollen, nectar, or flowers themselves, may be important cross-pollinators of some plants such as members of the Araceae and Zamiaceae, that produce prodigious amounts of pollen. Others, for example the Hopliini, specialise on flowers of Asteraceae and Aizoaceae.

Minute midges and flower-thrips can occur in vast numbers, moving between flowers and plant individuals, enabling some species to contribute to the pollination of tree-crops such as cacao, Theobroma cacao L. (Malvaceae) and elderflower Sambucus nigra L. (Adoxaceae). Ants also pollinate some kinds of flowers, but for the most part they are parasites, consuming nectar and/or pollen without conveying useful amounts of pollen to a stigma. Other insect orders are rarely pollinators, and then typically only incidentally (e.g., Hemiptera such as Anthocoridae and Miridae).

A strategy of great biological interest is that of sexual deception, where plants, generally orchids, produce remarkably complex combinations of pheromonal attractants and physical mimicry that induce male bees or wasps to attempt to mate with them, conveying pollinia in the process. Examples are known from all continents apart from Antarctica, though Australia appears to be exceptionally rich in examples. 

Whole groups of plants, such as certain fynbos Moraea and Erica species produce flowers on sticky peduncles or with sticky corolla tubes that only permit access to flying pollinators, whether bird, bat, or insect.

Other invertebrates 
Experimental evidence has shown invertebrates (mostly small crustaceans) acting as pollinators in underwater environments. Beds of seagrass have been shown to reproduce this way in the absence of currents. It is not yet known how important invertebrate pollinators might be for other species. Later, Idotea balthica was discovered to help Gracilaria gracilis reproduce – the first known case of an animal helping algae reproduce.

Vertebrates

Bats are important pollinators of some tropical flowers, visiting to take nectar. Birds, particularly hummingbirds, honeyeaters and sunbirds also accomplish much pollination, especially of deep-throated flowers. Other vertebrates, such as kinkajous, monkeys, lemurs, possums, rodents and lizards have been recorded pollinating some plants.

Humans can be pollinators, as many gardeners have discovered that they must hand pollinate garden vegetables, whether because of pollinator decline (as has been occurring in parts of the U.S. since the mid-20th century) or simply to keep a strain genetically pure. This can involve using a small brush or cotton swab to move pollen, or to simply tap or shake tomato blossoms to release the pollen for the self-pollinating flowers. Tomato blossoms are self-fertile, but (with the exception of potato-leaf varieties) have the pollen inside the anther, and the flower requires shaking to release the pollen through pores. This can be done by wind, by humans, or by a sonicating bee (one that vibrates its wing muscles while perched on the flower), such as a bumblebee. Sonicating bees are extremely efficient pollinators of tomatoes, and colonies of bumblebees are quickly replacing humans as the primary pollinators for greenhouse tomatoes.

Pollinator population declines and conservation

Pollinators provide a key ecosystem service vital to the maintenance of both wild and agricultural plant communities. In 1999 the Convention on Biological Diversity issued the São Paulo Declaration on Pollinators, recognizing the critical role that these species play in supporting and maintaining terrestrial productivity as well as the survival challenges they face due to anthropogenic change. Today pollinators are considered to be in a state of decline; some species, such as Franklin's bumble bee (Bombus franklini) have been red-listed and are in danger of extinction. Although managed bee hives are increasing worldwide, these can not compensate for the loss of wild pollinators in many locations.

Declines in the health and population of pollinators pose what could be a significant threat to the integrity of biodiversity, to global food webs, and to human health. At least 80% of our world's crop species require pollination to set seed. An estimated one out of every three bites of food comes to us through the work of animal pollinators. The quality of pollinator service has declined over time and this had led to concerns that pollination will be less resistant to extinction in the future.

A 2022 study concludes that the decline of pollinator populations is responsible for 500,000 early human deaths per year by reducing the supply of healthy foods. A decline of pollinators has caused 3-5% loss of fruits, vegetables and nuts. Lower consumption of these healthy foods translates to 1% of all deaths, according to the authors.

Strategy

In recent times, environmental groups have put pressure on the Environmental Protection Agency to ban neonicotinoids, a type of insecticide. In May 2015, the Obama Administration released a strategy called National Strategy to Promote the Health of Honey Bees and Other Pollinators. The administration announced it would include input from the pesticide industry in putting together the initiative.

The task force goal is "tackling and reducing the impact of multiple stressors on pollinator health, including pests and pathogens, reduced habitat, lack of nutritional resources, and exposure to pesticides."

The EPA and U.S. Department of Agriculture are leading the task force.

Structure of plant-pollinator networks 

Wild pollinators often visit many plant species and plants are visited by many pollinator species. All these relations together form a network of interactions between plants and pollinators. Surprising similarities were found in the structure of networks consisting out of the interactions between plants and pollinators. This structure was found to be similar in very different ecosystems on different continents, consisting of entirely different species.

The structure of plant-pollinator networks may have large consequences for the way in which pollinator communities respond to increasingly harsh conditions. Mathematical models, examining the consequences of this network structure for the stability of pollinator communities suggest that the specific way in which plant-pollinator networks are organized minimizes competition between pollinators and may even lead to strong indirect facilitation between pollinators when conditions are harsh. This allows pollinator species to survive together under harsh conditions. But it also means that pollinator species collapse simultaneously when conditions pass a critical point. This simultaneous collapse occurs, because pollinator species depend on each other when surviving under difficult conditions.

Such a community-wide collapse, involving many pollinator species, can occur suddenly when increasingly harsh conditions pass a critical point and recovery from such a collapse might not be easy. The improvement in conditions needed for pollinators to recover, could be substantially larger than the improvement needed to return to conditions at which the pollinator community collapsed.

See also 
Self-pollination
Pollinator Partnership
Polli:Nation

References

Bibliography

External links 

Pollinator Partnership
Pollinators Project Regeneration
Pollinator & Visitor Image Database
Resources on Pollinators from the National Academies

Pollination
Symbiosis
Beekeeping
Insect ecology